The Student, Teachers, and Officers Preventing School Violence Act of 2018, also known as the STOP School Violence Act, is pending legislation to provide funding grants to schools to be used for implementing security measures.

References

Stoneman Douglas High School shooting
Gun politics in the United States
School violence